Tadashi Satō (Nihongo:  July 20, 1849 - April 27, 1920) was a Japanese Army officer and politician.

As a lieutenant colonel in the Imperial Japanese Army, he was given command of the 18th Infantry Regiment on October 29, 1891.  He was later promoted to colonel, and wounded in battle on March 4, 1895 during the First Sino-Japanese War.

As a politician, he was Mayor of Hiroshima from January 10 to April 20, 1896.

References
"Chronological List of the Mayors of Hiroshima City" Hiroshima Municipality

Mayors of Hiroshima
1849 births
1920 deaths